In the 2007 season, the English cricket club Yorkshire was placed sixth in the County Championship, winning 4 of their 16 matches and drawing 8.

Championship

Pro40

Friends Provident

County Championship Scorecards
Surrey v Yorkshire

 Points: Surrey 5, Yorkshire 22

 Yorkshire v Durham 

 Points: Surrey 5, Yorkshire 22

Hampshire v Yorkshire

 Points: Hampshire 9, Yorkshire 9

Yorkshire v Worcestershire

 Points: Yorkshire 22, Worcestershire 2

Yorkshire v Worcestershire

 Points: Durham 22, Yorkshire 7

Kent v Yorkshire

 Points: Kent 7, Yorkshire 11

Yorkshire v Sussex

 Points: Yorkshire 7, Sussex 7

Lancashire v Yorkshire

 Points: Lancashire 8, Yorkshire 9

Warwickshire v Yorkshire

 Points: Warwickshire 9, Yorkshire 9

Yorkshire v Surrey

 Points: Yorkshire 10, Surrey 8

Yorkshire v Kent

 Points: Yorkshire 12, Kent 11

Yorkshire v Lancashire

 Points: Yorkshire 2, Lancashire 22

Warwickshire v Yorkshire

 Points: Worcestershire 17, Yorkshire 4

Yorkshire v Warwickshire

 Points: Yorkshire 22, Warwickshire 2

Sussex v Yorkshire

 Points: Sussex 22, Yorkshire 3

Yorkshire v Hampshire

 Points: Yorkshire 5, Hampshire 8

Friends Provident Scorecards
Nottinghamshire v Yorkshire

 Points: Nottinghamshire 0, Yorkshire 2

Scotland v Yorkshire

 Points: Scotland 0, Yorkshire 2

Yorkshire v Leicestershire

 Points: Yorkshire 0, Leicestershire 2

Yorkshire v Worcestershire

 Points: Yorkshire 1, Worcestershire 1

Lancashire v Yorkshire

 Points: Lancashire 2, Yorkshire 0

Warwickshire v Yorkshire

 Points: Warwickshire 1, Yorkshire 1

Derbyshire v Yorkshire

 Points: Derbyshire 0, Yorkshire 2

Yorkshire v Durham

 Points: Yorkshire 0, Durham 2

Yorkshire v Northamptonshire

 Points: Yorkshire 2, Northamptonshire 0

Twenty20 Cup Scorecards
Leicestershire v Yorkshire

 Points: Leicestershire 2, Yorkshire 0

Yorkshire v Lancashire

 Points: Yorkshire 1, Lancashire 1

Lancashire v Yorkshire

 Points: Lancashire 2, Yorkshire 0

Nottinghamshire v Yorkshire

 Points: Nottinghamshire 2, Yorkshire 0

Yorkshire v Durham

 Points: Yorkshire 2, Durham 0

Durham v Yorkshire

 Points: Durham 0, Yorkshire 2

Yorkshire v Nottinghamshire

 Points: Yorkshire 2, Nottinghamshire 0

Yorkshire v Derbyshire

 Points: Yorkshire 2, Derbyshire 0

Sussex v Yorkshire

 Sussex progressed to the semi-finals.

Natwest Pro40 Scorecards
Yorkshire v Somerset

 Points: Yorkshire 2, Somerset 0

Yorkshire v Middlesex

 Points: Yorkshire 2, Middlesex 0

Leicestershire v Yorkshire

 Points: Leicestershire 1, Yorkshire 1

Glamorgan v Yorkshire

 Points: Glamorgan 0, Yorkshire 2

Yorkshire v Surrey

 Points: Yorkshire 0, Surrey 2

Durham v Yorkshire

 Points: Durham 2, Yorkshire 0

Kent v Yorkshire

 Points: Kent 2, Yorkshire 0

Yorkshire v Derbyshire

 Points: Yorkshire 2, Derbyshire 0

Sources
 BBC Sport
 Yorkshire CC's website

References

2007 in English cricket
2007